José Santos Poyatos (born 26 March 1962 in Barcelona) is a T41 track and field athlete from Spain.  He competed at the 1976 Summer Paralympics, earning a silver in the 100 metre race and a bronze in the long jump.

References

External links 
 
 

1962 births
Living people
Spanish disability athletes
Spanish male sprinters
Spanish male long jumpers
Paralympic athletes of Spain
Paralympic silver medalists for Spain
Paralympic bronze medalists for Spain
Paralympic medalists in athletics (track and field)
Athletes (track and field) at the 1976 Summer Paralympics
Athletes (track and field) at the 1980 Summer Paralympics
Medalists at the 1976 Summer Paralympics
Medalists at the 1980 Summer Paralympics
Athletes from Barcelona
Male competitors in athletics with disabilities